Panda Cloud Antivirus is an antivirus software developed by Panda Security, a free and a paid version are available. It is cloud-based in the sense that files are scanned on a remote server without using processing power of the user's machine. The cloud technology is based on Panda's Collective Intelligence. It can run constantly, providing protection against viruses and malicious websites but slowing the system to some extent, or do a system scan.

Features
According to Panda Security, Panda Cloud Antivirus is able to detect viruses, trojans, worms, spyware, dialers, hacking tools, hacker and other security risks.

Panda Cloud Antivirus relies on its "Collective Intelligence" and  the cloud for up-to-date information. It normally uses an Internet connection to access up-to-date information; if the Internet cannot be accessed, it will use a local cache of "the most common threats in circulation".

Reviews
An April 2009 review found Panda Cloud Antivirus 1.0 to be clean, fast, simple, easy to use, and with good detection rates. The same review scored Panda 100.00% in malware detection and 100.0% in malicious URL detection. Its overall score was 100%, a strong protection factor considering it is software.

When version 1.0 was released on November 10, 2009, PC Magazine reviewed Panda Cloud Antivirus and gave it an Editor's Choice Award for Best  AV.

TechRadar's review states "We think that Panda Cloud Antivirus is best viewed as a defense tool rather than a utility for cleaning up a system that's already riddled with infection."

License
The  free edition of Panda Cloud Antivirus is released under a license. Its usage is exclusively allowed for private households, state schools, non-governmental and non-profit organizations.

References

External links
Panda Cloud Antivirus Website
Interview with the developers

Antivirus software
Freeware